Eric Gjerde is an American politician and educator who is a member of the Iowa House of Representatives from the 67th district. Elected in 2020, he assumed office on January 11, 2021.

Early life and education 
Gjerde earned a Bachelor of Arts degree in sociology and religion from Augustana College, a Master of Education in secondary education and another in educational administration from the University of Iowa, and a Doctor of Education from the University of Northern Iowa.

Career 
After earning his first master's degree, Gjerde worked as a teacher and EMT in Le Roy, Minnesota. As an EdD student, he worked as a special education teacher at Clear Creek Amana High School. He has since worked as a special education teacher and coach in the Cedar Rapids Community School District. Gjerde is a volunteer deputy with the Linn County, Iowa Sheriff's Office.

In 2018, Gjerde was the Democratic nominee for district 67 in the Iowa House of Representatives, losing to Ashley Hinson. After Hinson announced that she would not seek re-election to the Iowa House and instead run for the United States House of Representatives, Gjerde declared his candidacy to succeed her. He did not face an opponent in the Democratic primary and defeated Republican nominee Sally Ann Abbott in the general election.

Personal life 
Gjerde and his wife, Amy, have three daughters.

References 

Living people
Augustana College (Illinois) alumni
University of Iowa alumni
University of Northern Iowa alumni
Educators from Iowa
Democratic Party members of the Iowa House of Representatives
21st-century American politicians
Year of birth missing (living people)